Lina Hawyani al-Hasan (born 1975) is a Syrian novelist, journalist and writer. She studied philosophy at the University of Damascus. She runs the literary supplement of the Damascus newspaper al-Thawra. As a writer, al-Hasan has published more than half a dozen books, including novels and non-fiction. In 2010, she was selected to take part in the second IPAF Nadwa, a workshop for young writers held under the aegis of the International Prize for Arabic Fiction and Sheikh Hamdan of the UAE.

References

1975 births
Syrian journalists
Syrian women journalists
Syrian women novelists
Syrian novelists
Living people
20th-century novelists
20th-century Syrian women writers
20th-century Syrian writers
21st-century Syrian women writers
21st-century Syrian writers